Shitij Kapur  is a medical doctor and administrator; he is the 21st president and principal of King's College London since 1 June 2021. Previously, he was the dean of the Faculty of Medicine Dentistry and Health Sciences and assistant vice-chancellor (health) of the University of Melbourne from 2016 to 2020.

Early life and education
After graduating from All India Institute of Medical Sciences in 1988, Kapur did his residency training in psychiatry at the University of Pittsburgh.

Kapur was a professor of psychiatry at the University of Toronto from 2001 to 2007. From 2007 to 2016, he was the dean and head of school at the Institute of Psychiatry, Psychology and Neuroscience (IoPPN) at King's College London, He is the currently the president and principal of King's College London. He succeeded acting president and principal Evelyn Welch on 1 June 2021.

University appointments
Kapur became president and principal of King's College London in June 2021, replacing Sir Edward Byrne AC and interim principal Evelyn Welch. Prior to his current position, he was dean and assistant vice chancellor (health) at the University of Melbourne from 2016 to 2020 and the executive dean and professor of psychiatry at King's College London until 2016. Prior to that Kapur was a professor of psychiatry at the University of Toronto. While there, he served as the vice-president for research at the Centre for Addiction and Mental Health. From 2001 to 2007, he was a Canada Research Chair at the University of Toronto

Leadership roles and contributions to the field
Kapur was a non-executive director of the South London and Maudsley Hospital (2010-2016), one of Europe's pre-eminent psychiatric hospitals. He currently serves as a non-executive director of the Royal Melbourne Hospital, one of Australia's leading tertiary hospitals. He serves as a director on the board of the Walter and Eliza Hall Institute of Medical Research (WEHI), Australia's leading independent biomedical research Institute, and also serves on the board of the St. Vincent's Institute of Medical Research in Melbourne. He is the chair of the executive board of the Melbourne Academic Centre for Health, a partnership of 10 hospitals and seven independent medical research institutes and the University of Melbourne.

He is a founding board member of the Schizophrenia International Research Society.

References

Year of birth missing (living people)
Living people
University of Toronto alumni
Academic staff of the University of Toronto
Academic staff of the University of Melbourne
Principals of King's College London
Academics of King's College London
Fellows of King's College London
Schizophrenia researchers
Fellows of the Academy of Medical Sciences (United Kingdom)